Iva Slaninová - Mádlová is an orienteering competitor who competed for Czechoslovakia. At the 1987 World Orienteering Championships in Gérardmer she won a bronze medal in the relay with the Czechoslovak team, which in addition to Slaninová consisted of Iva Kalibanová, Ada Kucharová and Jana Galiková.

References

Year of birth missing (living people)
Living people
Czechoslovak orienteers
Female orienteers
Foot orienteers
World Orienteering Championships medalists